Harvey Phillip Pratt (born 1941) is an American forensic artist and Native American artist, who has worked for over forty years in law enforcement, completing thousands of composite drawings and hundreds of soft tissue postmortem reconstructions.  To this end, his work has assisted in thousands of arrests and hundreds of identification of unidentified human remains throughout America. His expertise in witness description drawing, skull reconstruction, skull tracing, age progression, soft tissue postmortem drawing and restoration of photographs and videos have aided law enforcement agencies both nationally and internationally.  Pratt also assists investigations through training classes, besides lecturing before universities, colleges, schools and civic groups. In the early 2000s Pratt teamed up with David Paulides in researching Bigfoot on the Hoopa Reservation in California, as well as in his home state of Oklahoma.

Life
Pratt was born in El Reno, Oklahoma and is a member of the Cheyenne & Arapaho tribes where he is recognized as one of the traditional Cheyenne Peace Chiefs, also known as the Council of Forty-Four. He has been recognized by the Cheyenne People as an Outstanding Southern Cheyenne. He is the great grandson of scout, guide, interpreter and Sand Creek massacre survivor, Edmund Guerrier.  He is the great great grandson of American frontiersman, William Bent. Pratt lives in Guthrie, Oklahoma.

Forensic Art

Pratt began his career with Oklahoma's Midwest City Police Department in 1965, where, as a police officer, he completed his first composite drawing that resulted in an arrest and conviction. He joined the Oklahoma State Bureau of Investigation in 1972 as a narcotics investigator and retired in 1992 as an Assistant Director. He is now employed with the agency as a full-time forensic specialist.

Pratt's forensic expertise has contributed to many high-profile cases: The Green River Killer (Gary Ridgeway), Oklahoma Girl Scout Murders (Gene Leroy Hart), Henry Lee Lucas and Ottis Toole, Bobby Joe Long, The I-5 Killer (Randall Woodfield), Tommy Ward and Karl Fontenot, Tommy Lynn Sells, World Trade Center 1993 bombings, Ted Bundy, Sirloin Stockade Murders (Roger Dale Stafford, Verna Stafford and Harold Stafford), Joe Fischer, Roger Wheeler murder, the Oklahoma City bombing of the Alfred P. Murrah Federal Building, Donald Eugene Webb, Oklahoma State Fair Abducted Girls (Roy Russell Long), and Randolph Dial.

In the mid 1980s, Pratt developed the soft tissue postmortem drawing method. Using this method, the forensic artist draws or paints on the photograph of a victim to repair tissue damage or decomposition. The drawing repairs the trauma to the victim so that the final image will be more presentable when asking for law enforcement's or the public's assistance in identification.

Native American Art
Pratt encompasses painting, sculpting, wood carving, mural painting, bronze work, architectural design and graphic design. He is a self-taught artist and creates in the media of oil, acrylic, watercolor, metal, clay and wood. His artwork is a blend of his forensic art and law enforcement experience with traditional Native American environment.

Pratt has received awards for his artwork at Inter-Tribal Indian Ceremonials, Gallup, New Mexico, and Red Earth Festival, Oklahoma City, Oklahoma.  In 2005, he was given the title "Master Artist" by Red Earth, as well as being selected as the Red Earth 2005 Honored One.

His works are in many permanent collections, including the National Park Service, the Smithsonian Institution, the Sequoyah National Research Center, and the University of Oklahoma.  He accepted state appointments to the Oklahoma Arts Council by Governor Frank Keating and Governor Brad Henry.

The Smithsonian's National Museum of the American Indian chose Pratt's Warriors' Circle of Honor, a 12-foot tall, stainless-steel circle balanced on a curved stone drum as the centerpiece of the National Native American Veterans Memorial. The memorial was installed outside the museum in 2020, but the official in-person dedication ceremonies did not take place until Veterans Day Weekend of 2022 because of the pandemic.

Bigfoot Forensics & Artwork
Pratt provided forensic artwork for David Paulides in the books Tribal Bigfoot and The Hoopa Project. Through extensive research, interviews and travels, Pratt produced dozens of forensic sketches from witnesses that David Paulides and himself met in California and his home state of Oklahoma. Pratt also has an online store on his own personal website where he sells bigfoot artwork.

Notes

References
Brown, Michele M. "Native American forensic artist featured at Guthrie Art Walk", Guthrie News Leader, 10 November 2005
Calhoun, Sharon & English, Billie. Oklahoma Adventure. Oklahoma City/ACP, 2001. 
English, Billie & Calhoun, Sharon. Oklahoma Heritage. Oklahoma City/Holt, Calhoun, Clark & Quaid, 1989. 
Fanning, Diane. Through the Window. St. Martin's Press, 2003. 
Fossett, Judy. "Clues Sketchy In Tulsa Killing", The Daily Oklahoman, 29 May 1981
Lester, Patrick D.  The Biographical Directory of Native American Painters. SIR Publications, 1995. 
McDonnell, Brandy. "2005's honoree also fights crime", The Oklahoman, 29 May 2005
McDonnell, Brandy "Monumental opportunity: Oklahoma artist Harvey Pratt's 'Warriors' Circle of Honor' design chosen for National Native American Veterans Memorial", The Oklahoman, 01, July 2018
Mayer, Robert. The Dreams of Ada: A true story of murder, obsession, and a small town. New York/Viking, 1991. 
National Archives & Records Administration, SW Region Fort Worth, Record Group 5, Bureau of Indian Affairs, Concho (Cheyenne & Arapaho Agency), E12 Land Transactions, Report on Heirship
Oklahoma State Bureau of Investigation Forensic Art retrieved 2 January 2008
Pratt, Harvey - Native American Artist & Police Forensic Artist retrieved 27 December 2007
Smith, Carlton & Guillen Thomas. The Search for the Green River Killer. New York/Penguin, 1991. 
Stott, Kim. "Artist Retouches Photos To Help Identify Victims", The Sunday Oklahoman, 31 October 1982
Taylor, Karen T. Forensic Art and Illustration. Boca Raton/CRC Press, 2000. 
Wilkerson, Michael & Wilkerson Dick. Someone Cry for the Children: The unsolved Girl Scout murders of Oklahoma and the case of Gene  Leroy Hart. New York/Dial, 1981.

External links
Harvey Pratt's Native American Art & Forensic Art Website
Oklahoma State Bureau of Investigation
Red Earth Inc.
Oral History Interview with Harvey Pratt
Library of Congress Video Interview with Harvey Pratt

1941 births
Living people
People from El Reno, Oklahoma
People from Guthrie, Oklahoma
Painters from Oklahoma
Cheyenne and Arapaho Tribes people
Forensic artists
Native American painters
Native American sculptors
People from Midwest City, Oklahoma
Sculptors from Oklahoma